John Riggs may refer to:

John M. Riggs, retired U.S. Army general
John Mankey Riggs, first American dentist specializing in periodontology
Jack Riggs, American politician

See also
John Riggins (born 1949), former American football running back